Presidential elections were held in Colombia on 25 May 1986. The result was a victory for Virgilio Barco Vargas of the Liberal Party, who received 58.36% of the vote.

Electoral system
The elections were held using first-past-the-post voting and were the first in which the electoral commission counted blank votes as valid votes.

Results

References

Presidential elections in Colombia
Colombia
1986 in Colombia